The men's marathon event at the 1985 Summer Universiade was held at the Kobe Universiade Memorial Stadium in Kobe on 1 September 1985.

Results

References

Athletics at the 1985 Summer Universiade
1985